Johann Sebastian Bach's chorale harmonisations, alternatively named four-part chorales, are Lutheran hymn settings that characteristically conform to the following:
 four-part harmony
 SATB vocal forces
 pre-existing hymn tune allotted to the soprano part
 text treatment:
 homophonic
 no repetitions (i.e., each syllable of the hymn text is sung one time)

Around 400 of such chorale settings by Bach, mostly composed in the first four decades of the 18th century, are extant:
 Around half of that number are chorales which were transmitted in the context of larger vocal works such as cantatas, motets, Passions and oratorios. A large part of these chorales are extant as autographs by the composer, and for nearly all of them a colla parte instrumental and/or continuo accompaniment are known.
 All other four-part chorales exclusively survived in collections of short works, which include manuscripts and 18th-century prints. Apart from the Three Wedding Chorales collection (BWV 250–252), these are copies by other scribes and prints only published after the composer's death, lacking context information, such as instrumental accompaniment, for the individual harmonisations.

Apart from homophonic choral settings, Bach's Lutheran hymn harmonisations also appear as:
 sung chorale fantasias in some of Bach's larger vocal works
 hymn melodies for which Bach composed or improved a thorough bass accompaniment, for instance as included in Georg Christian Schemelli's Musicalisches Gesang-Buch
 harmonisations included in purely instrumental compositions, most typically organ compositions such as chorale preludes or chorale partitas.

History 
The compositions by Johann Sebastian Bach that had been printed during his lifetime were nearly exclusively instrumental works. Moreover, by the time Bach died in 1750 it was forgotten that a few of his vocal works (BWV 71, BWV 439–507,...) had indeed been printed in the first half of the 18th century. In the period between the publication of The Art of Fugue in the early 1750s, and the publication of further works from 1900, only one group of Bach's works was published: his four-part chorales.

The most complete 18th century publication of chorales by J. S. Bach is Carl Philipp Emanuel Bach's edition in four volumes, published by Breitkopf from 1784 to 1787. About half of the chorale harmonisations in this collection have their origin in other extant works by Bach. This collection went through four more editions and countless reprintings until 1897. Several other collections of chorales by J. S. Bach were published, some of these using the original C-clefs or different texts.

The loss of musical material from Bach's death to the first printings of chorale collections may have been substantial. Not only are many works the chorales were extracted from no longer extant but there is no way of knowing how much of all the harmonisations that were once compiled the current collections include. For example, there is no way of knowing how many of the 150 harmonisations first proposed for sale in 1764 also appear in Princess Anna Amalia's manuscript which ultimately forms the basis of the Breitkopf edition. As to the chorale melodies with figured bass, current collections include less than one hundred of them whereas those proposed for sale in 1764 numbered 240.

The chorale harmonisations BWV 250–438 were probably all extracted from lost larger vocal works. For six of them the work they have been derived from has been identified. Bach's chorale harmonisations are all for a four-part choir (SATB), but Riemenschneider's and Terry's collections contain one 5-part SSATB choral harmonisation (Welt, ade! ich bin dein müde, Riemenscheider No. 150, Terry No. 365), not actually by Bach, but used by Bach as the concluding chorale to cantata Wer weiß, wie nahe mir mein Ende, BWV 27.

Some harmonisations exist in different keys, i.e. pitches, in 18th-century sources: for instance a Bach cantata autograph gives the four-part chorale in one key, and the same harmonisation is found in one or more of the early chorale compilations in a different key.

Manuscripts 
The first record of the existence and sale of groups of collected chorale harmonisations and chorale melodies with figured bass extracted from larger works by J.S. Bach is from 1764, fourteen years after Bach's death. In that year the firm Breitkopf und Sohn announced for sale manuscript copies of 150 chorale harmonisations and 240 chorale melodies with figured bass by J.S. Bach.

In 1777 Johann Kirnberger started an active letter campaign to induce Breitkopf to publish a complete set of chorale harmonisations. Kirnberger's letters emphasize his motivation to have the chorales printed in order to preserve them for the benefit of future generations. The manuscript to be used once belonged to C. P. E. Bach, who sold it through Kirnberger to Princess Anna Amalia of Prussia (for twelve louis d'or). It is presumed that this manuscript contained neither the text of the chorales nor any reference to the larger works from which the harmonisations had been taken. The manuscript's harmonisations extracted only the vocal parts and ignored the instrumental parts and the continuo, even though all of Bach's chorale settings included both instrumental parts and continuo. The instrumental parts were either independent, so called obbligato instrumental parts, or mostly doubled the vocal parts sometimes separating from it for a very few beats, and the continuo had its bass mostly double the vocal bass at the lower octave, but could also separate from it for a very few beats. Finally in some cases, for reasons unknown, whoever extracted the chorale from the larger work, changed the key of the setting.

 "Y" manuscript hypothesis  Hypothetical early autograph collection of chorale harmonisations from which Bach would have selected settings he later integrated into his larger vocal works.

 Larger vocal works manuscripts  Mostly extant as autograph score and/or as parts written out under Bach's supervision: many of these works, such as cantatas and Passions, include four-part chorales

 Three Wedding Chorales autograph  Bach's autograph of the wedding chorales BWV 250–252, written between 1734 and 1738.

 Dietel manuscript, a.k.a. Dietel Collection and, in German, Choralsammlung Dietel

 Earliest of the extant larger collection of chorale harmonisations manuscripts. It contains 149 chorale harmonisations (not 150 as is written on its title page) and originated around 1735. The music in the manuscript was copied by Johann Ludwig Dietel, one of Bach's pupils from the Thomasschule.

Printed editions 
A few chorale harmonisations had been published before Bach adopted them into his larger vocal works, and are therefore listed as spurious in the third annex of the BWV catalogue:
 , also known as closing movement of cantata BWV 27: five-part harmonisation published, for instance, in Vopelius' 1682 Neu Leipziger Gesangbuch, p. 947.
 Cantata BWV 43, movement 11: harmonisation by  published in 1652, later adopted in Vopelius' Neu Leipziger Gesangbuch: "Ermuntre dich, mein schwacher Geist", p. 70.
 Cantata BWV 8, movement 6 (BWV 8/6): Daniel Vetter's four-part setting of "Liebster Gott, wann werd ich sterben", published in 1713.
Several more harmonisations stay close to the version published by Vopelius: for example "Christus, der ist mein Leben", BWV 281, is a variant of the harmonisation found in the Neu Leipziger Gesangbuch, with added embellishments and the harmonic structure altered for one of the tune's four phrases.

Printed collections of Bach's harmonisations usually provide an alphabetical collation of the chorales, that is, ranged alphabetically by text incipit of the hymn. Some editions contain an alphabetical index at the end of the compilation, for instance at the end of the final volume of C. P. E. Bach's 18th-century collection. Other editions, such as the Breitkopf compilations of 1892 and 1899, present the chorales themselves in alphabetical order. However, not all of these alphabetical collations result in analogous chorale sequences. Some major differences in this respect result from chorales that are known by different names: in that case it depends on the editor which name is used for the collation. For example, the melody of "Ach, lieben Christen, seid getrost" also being known as "Wo Gott der Herr nicht bei uns hält" it is an editor's discretion whether BWV 256 is found early on or near the end of an alphabetically sorted collection.

18th century 

Some of Bach's voice and thoroughbass settings published in Georg Christian Schemelli's 1736 Musicalisches Gesang-Buch are better known in their four-part realisation included in the chorale harmonisation collections.

 Chorales published by Birnstiel (200)  In 1765 F. W. Birnstiel published 100 chorales in Berlin. The edition had been initiated by F. W. Marpurg and completed, edited and supplemented with a preface and a list of errata by C. P. E. Bach. A second volume of 100 was issued by the same publisher in 1769, edited by J. F. Agricola. C. P. E. Bach criticised this publication as being full of mistakes in an article which was published in Hamburg in the Staats- und Gelehrte Zeitung des Hamburgischen unpartheyeschen Correspondenten on 30 May 1769, in which he also claimed that some of the chorale harmonisations included in the volume had not been composed by his father.

 C. P. E. Bach's edition for Breitkopf (371)  After Kirnberger died in 1783, C. P. E. Bach became Breitkopf's editor for the chorales, which he then published in four parts:
 Vol. I (1784): Nos. 1–96
 Vol. II (1785): Nos. 97–194
 Vol. III (1786): Nos. 195–283
 Vol. IV (1787): Nos. 283–370
 Since the number 283 was used twice (last number of Vol. III and first number of Vol. IV), the collection actually contained 371 items. The collection also contained several doubles (e.g. No. 156 is identical to No. 307): it totalled 348 independent harmonisations.

19th century 
C. P. E. Bach's selection of 371 chorale harmonisations was republished a few times in the 19th century, for instance by Carl Ferdinand Becker in 1832 (third edition), and by Alfred Dörffel in 1870.

 Bach Gesellschaft (larger vocal works + 3 + 185) The Bach-Gesellschaft Ausgabe (BGA, Bach Gesellschaft edition) kept the chorale settings that were part of a larger vocal work (cantata, motet, Passion or oratorio) together with these larger vocal works and added the Three Wedding Chorales to its 13th volume containing wedding cantatas. The remaining separate four-part chorales, purged from doubles, were ordered alphabetically and numbered from 1 to 185 in the 39th volume which was published in 1892.

 Richter's edition for Breitkopf (389)  In the late 19th century Bernhard Friedrich Richter collected all straightforward chorale harmonisations that had appeared in the BGA edition —including as well the separate ones as those from larger vocal works—, added a "Herr Gott, dich loben alle wir" harmonisation from a variant version of Cantata 130, and numbered all of these chorales in alphabetical order. The set contained a few doubtful and spurious settings (e.g. from Telemann cantatas which at the time were still attributed to Bach), but four-part settings which were part of a more complex texture (e.g. the fifth movement of Cantata 22 where the vocal homophony is supplemented by instrumental figuration) were not always included by Richter. The set was published by Breitkopf as Joh. Seb. Bach: 389 Choral-Gesänge für gemischten Chor in 1899.

20th century 
The Bach-Werke-Verzeichnis, published in 1950, did not assign a separate BWV number to harmonisations contained in extant larger vocal works such as cantatas and Passions. The Three Wedding Chorales were assigned the numbers 250 to 252, and the 185 (+1: see below) four-part chorales contained in Vol. 39 of the BGA edition were given, in the same order, the numbers 253 to 438.

 Terry (405)  Published in 1929, Charles Sanford Terry's J. S. Bach's Four-Part Chorales contains 405 chorale harmonisations and 95 melodies with figured bass. The collection was reprinted 1964, with a foreword by Walter Emery.

 Riemenschneider (371)  Albert Riemenschneider's collection of 371 chorales was published in 1941. It contained the same 371 settings as the C. P. E. Bach edition for Breitkopf, but with a few differences in the collation. In some cases Riemenschneider restored some information about obbligato instrumental parts based on extant larger works, e.g. his No. 270 from cantata BWV 161, or about the continuo bass line if this does not exactly coincide with the vocal bass, e.g. his No. 29 from cantata BWV 32 and his No. 35 from the Christmas Oratorio. Riemenschneider did however not restore original keys to the extant larger works, but instead kept the chorales in the keys as they had been published in the Breitkopf collection, e.g. his No. 22, in E-flat major, comes from cantata BWV 180 where it is in F major. At times the key signature in Riemenschneider's edition does not correspond to the key, for instance No. 19, in G minor but written with a "Dorian" G key signature. This too is presumably reproduced from the Breitkopf edition, which would have followed a common 17th- and 18th-century practice.

 Editio Musica Budapest (388)  Editio Musica Budapest (EMB) published Imre Sulyok's edition of 388 chorale harmonisations in 1982. With a few differences (e.g. a de-doubling of the near-identical BWV 253 and 414, and some differences in the collation) the collection is largely comparable to the Richter edition.

 Kalmus (389)  Kalmus republished the 389 chorales of Richter's collection.

 NBA  The New Bach Edition published the Three Wedding Chorales and the four-part chorales contained in the Dietel collection in 1991 (Series III, Vol. 2/1). The chorales from C. P. E. Bach's collection were published in 1996 (Series III, Vol. 2/2). Vol. 3 of the same series, published in 2002, contains a few chorales of doubtful authenticity found in other manuscripts and early editions. Vol. 9 of the second series, published in 2000, contains a few doubtful chorales found in various Passions. Better known chorale harmonisations are also contained in other volumes of series I (cantatas), II (Passions and oratorios) and V (e.g. BWV 299 as contained in the Notebook for Anna Magdalena Bach).

21st century 

 Czarnecki (413)  Christopher Czarnecki (editor). J.S. Bach 413 Chorales. SeeZar Publications, 2014. 

 Dahn (420)  Luke Dahn (editor). J.S. Bach Chorales: a new critical and complete edition arranged by BWV catalogue number with text and historical contextual information included for each chorale with numerous indices included in the appendix. LuxSitPress, 2017.

Chorale harmonisations in various collections 

Most of Bach's known chorale harmonisations are movements in his extant cantatas, motets, Passions and oratorios. These are compositions which have a BWV number ranging from 1 to 249. BWV 250 to 438 is the range of the separate four-part chorales. Chorale harmonisations with a number above 438 are mostly later additions to the BWV catalogue. The 5th chapter of the 1998 edition of the Bach-Werke-Verzeichnis (BWV2a) contains the chorales BWV 250–438, and some later additions (BWV 500a, 1084, 1089 and 1122–1126).

Numbering conventions 

All BWV numbers used in the listings below are according to the latest version of the Bach-Werke-Verzeichnis and further updates of these numbers found at the Bach Digital website. When a BWV number is followed by a slash ("/"), the number or letter after that slash indicates the movement in the composition.

Settings from Schemellis Gesangbuch are indicated by their BWV number (BWV 439–507), by the number of the hymn in the original publication (Nos. 1–954), and, between brackets, the number of the setting in Vol. 39 of the BGA edition (1–69).

A cross-reference between Lutheran hymns, their Zahn number, and their appearance in compositions by Bach (including, but not limited to, the chorale harmonisations) can be found pp. 471–481 of BWV2a.

In larger vocal works 
More than 200 of Bach's over 400 homophonic chorale harmonisations survived in his larger vocal works.

In church cantatas 

Four-part chorales also appearing as cantata movements composed by Johann Sebastian Bach (verse incipits, and their translations by Pamela Dellal, from the Emmanuel Music website unless otherwise indicated): BWV 1/6: "Wie bin ich doch so herzlich froh" ("How happy I am", v. 7 of "Wie schön leuchtet der Morgenstern")
• 2/6: "Das wollst du, Gott, bewahren rein" ("This, God, you would keep pure", v. 6 of Ach Gott, vom Himmel sieh darein")
• 3/6: "Erhalt mein Herz im Glauben rein" ("If my heart remains pure in faith", v. 18 of "Ach Gott, wie manches Herzeleid")
• 4/8
• 5/7
• 6/6
• 7/7
• 9/7
• 10/7
• 12/7
• 13/6
• 14/5
• 16/6
• 17/7
• 18/5
• 19/7
• 20/7=/11
• 22/5
• 24/6
• 25/6
• 26/6
• 28/6
• 29/8
• 30/6
• 31/9
• 32/6
• 33/6
• 36/4 and /8
• 37/6
• 38/6
• 39/7
• 40/3, /6 and /8
• 41/6
• 42/7
• 44/7
• 45/7
• 46/6
• 47/5
• 48/3 and /7
• 52/6
• 55/5
• 56/5
• 57/8
• 59/3
• 60/5
• 62/6  64.
• 64/2, /4 and /8
• 65/2 and /7
• 66/6
• 67/4 and /7
• 69/6
• 69a/6
• 70/7 and /11
• 72/6
• 73/5
• 74/8
• 75/7=/14
• 76/7=/14
• 77/6
• 78/7  79.
• 79/3 and /6
• 80/8
• 81/7
• 83/5
• 84/5
• 85/6
• 86/6
• 87/7
• 88/7
• 89/6
• 90/5
• 91/6
• 92/9
• 93/7
• 94/8
• 95/1 (extract: 282) and /7
• 96/6
• 97/9
• 99/6
• 100/6
• 101/7
• 102/7
• 103/6
• 104/6
• 105/6
• 107/7
• 108/6
• 110/7
• 111/6
• 112/5
• 113/1 and /8
• 114/7
• 115/6
• 116/6
• 117/4=/9
• 119/9
• 120/6
• 120a/8
• 121/6
• 122/6
• 123/6
• 124/6
• 125/6
• 126/6
• 127/5
• 128/5
• 129/5
• 130/6
• 133/6
• 135/6
• 136/6
• 137/5
• 139/6
• 140/7
• 144/3 and /6
• 145/a and /5
• 146/8
• 147/6=/10
• 148/6
• 149/7
• 151/5  153.
• 153/1, /5 and /9
• 154/3 and /8
• 155/5
• 156/6
• 157/5
• 158/4
• 159/5
• 161/6
• 162/6
• 164/6
• 165/6
• 166/6
• 167/5
• 168/6
• 169/7
• 171/6
• 172/6
• 174/5
• 175/7
• 176/6
• 177/5
• 178/7
• 179/6
• 180/7
• 183/5
• 184/5
• 185/6
• 187/7
• 188/6
• 190/7
• 194/6 and /12
• 195/6
• 197/5 and /10
• 197a/7 (≈398)

Spurious chorale harmonisations in Bach's autographs: BWV 8/6
• 27/6 (=Anh. 170)
• 43/11

Chorale harmonisations from spurious or doubtful cantatas (or: cantata versions) in the Richter/Kalmus collection of 389 chorale harmonisations: No. 130:  from a doubtful version of BWV 130
• No. 219: BWV 218/5 = TWV 1:634/5: "Komm, Gott Schöpfer, Heiliger Geist", by Telemann
• No. 387: BWV 219/5 = TWV 1:1328/5: "Wo Gott der Herr nicht bei uns hält", by Telemann

In motets 

Chorale harmonisations appearing in Bach's motets: BWV 226/2
• 227/1=/11, /3 (SSATB) and /7
• 229/2

In Passions

In St Matthew Passion 

Four-part chorales appearing in the St Matthew Passion: BWV 244/3, /10, /15≈/17, /25, /32, /37, /40, /44, /46, /54 and /62
• 244b/29

In St John Passion 

Four-part chorales appearing in the St John Passion: BWV 245/3, /5 (=BWV 416), /11, /14, /15, /17, /22, /26, /28, /37 and /40

In St Mark Passion pasticcio 

For his own performances of the Jesus Christus ist um unsrer Missetat willen verwundet Passion Bach composed and/or reworked a few of its chorales: No. 9b: "So gehst du nun, mein Jesu" (BWV 500a)
• No. 14: "O hilf Christe, Gottes Sohn" (BWV 1084)
• No. 29: "O Traurigkeit, o Herzeleid" (BWV deest)

In oratorios

Ascension Oratorio 

Four-part chorale appearing in the Ascension Oratorio: BWV 11/6

Christmas Oratorio 

Four-part chorales in Bach's Christmas Oratorio, BWV 248: Part I/5 and /9
• II/3, /8 and /14
• III/5, /10 and /12
• IV/7
• V/4 and /11
• VI/6 and /11

In chorale collections 

Somewhat less than 200 of Bach's chorale harmonisations only survived in early collections containing multiple, usually short, works.

Three Wedding Chorales, BWV 250–252

186 four-part chorales in BGA Vol. 39, BWV 253–438 

The Bach Gesellschaft published 185 four-part chorales in the 39th volume of its complete Bach-edition. The BWV 253–438 range, which, in its original collation, was based on the BGA publication does however contain 186 chorales. The difference is that BWV 279, (near-)identical to BWV 158/4, was not retained in the BGA set:
 BGA No. 26 → "Christ lag in Todesbanden", BWV 278
 not in BGA Vol. 39: "Christ lag in Todesbanden", BWV 279 (≈BWV 158/4, in BGA Vol. 32)
 BGA No. 27 → "Christ unser Herr zum Jordan kam", BWV 280

|}

In the 1725 Notebook for Anna Magdalena Bach 

Included in the second Notebook for Anna Magdalena Bach (started 1725):  BWV 299: "Dir, dir, Jehova, will ich singen" (included as No. 39, in both a four-part chorale version and a voice and bass version)
• BWV 397: "O Ewigkeit, du Donnerwort" (included as No. 42 in a voice and bass version = BWV 513)

With a voice and bass variant in Schemellis Gesangbuch 

Two-part versions in Schemellis Gesangbuch: No. 40 (3), BWV 447 → BWV 297
• No. 281 (18), BWV 481 → BWV 413
• No. 293 (22), BWV 499 → BWV 410
• No. 296 (23), BWV 500 ↔ BWV 500a, four-part variant in St Mark Passion pasticcio
• No. 315 (26), BWV 501 → BWV 412
• No. 320 (27), BWV 441 → BWV 441* or deest
• No. 397 (32), BWV 452 → BWV 299
• No. 488 (37), BWV 461 → BWV 320
• No. 741 (53), BWV 470 → BWV 357
• No. 779 (55), BWV 506 → BWV 424
• No. 881 (63), BWV 488 → BWV 258
• No. 894 (65), BWV 495 → BWV 405

Other four-part chorales in early manuscripts 

Authenticated as Bach's after the first edition (1950) of the Bach-Werke-Verzeichnis: BWV 1089: "Da Jesus an dem Kreuze stund"
• BWV 1122: "Denket doch, ihr Menschenkinder"
• BWV 1123: "Wo Gott zum Haus nicht gibt sein Gunst"
• BWV 1124: "Ich ruf zu dir, Herr Jesu Christ"
• BWV 1125: "O Gott, du frommer Gott"
• BWV 1126: "Lobet Gott, unsern Herren"
• BWV deest: "Liebster Gott, wenn werd ich sterben"

See also 
 List of compositions by Johann Sebastian Bach
 List of Bach cantatas (BWV 1–231)
 List of songs and arias of Johann Sebastian Bach (BWV 439–518)

References

Sources 
 
 
 
 
 
 
 Johann Theodor Mosewius. Johann Sebastian Bach in seinen Kirchen-Cantaten und Choralgesängen. Berlin: T. Trautwein, 1845.

Further reading

External links 

"Other Vocal Works sorted Thematically", Department of Computing Science, University of Alberta
"Index to Texts and Translations of Bach Cantatas and Other Vocal Works – Part 7: Chorales BWV 250–438"

Thomas Braatz: "The History of the Breitkopf Collection of J. S. Bach's Four-Part Chorales", September 2006; retrieved 21 May 2009.
Scores in Capella format 
Sortable Index of the Chorales by J.S. Bach at 

 
Chorale harmonisations by Johann Sebastian Bach, List of